Hospital Music is the third solo album by Canadian musician Matthew Good. It was released on July 31, 2007.

Good performed nearly all instruments himself, with the exception of drums and a few guitar and bass parts. The album artwork was painted by Vancouver artist Jeremy Crowle.

The album's lead single, "Born Losers", was featured as the "Single of the Week" on the American iTunes Store for the week starting July 31, 2007. The debut was significant due to Good's lack of previous success in the U.S. market, where he had previously released only one album—2001's Beautiful Midnight, which failed to make a major impact on U.S. charts.

Hospital Music was nominated at the 2008 Juno Awards for Best Rock Album.

Commercial performance
Hospital Music debuted at #1 on the Canadian albums chart, selling over 11,000 copies in its first week of release. The album was certified Gold in Canada on January 16, 2008.

Track listing
All tracks written by Matthew Good, except where noted.

Songs
 "Champions of Nothing" was first introduced to fans during Good's 2006 acoustic tour, when it was known as "When Hollywood Runs Out of Indians", and used as an introduction to the song "Tripoli". This title, taken from the first line in the song, is inspired by Edward R. Murrow's famous 1958 speech to the Radio Television News Directors Association and, according to Good, "symbolizes the need to placate an ignorant, empty, self-centred culture".
 "Metal Airplanes" was written on an airplane during Good's trip to England, before personal circumstances forced him to return to Vancouver, where he suffered from the manic episodes that ultimately led to his hospitalization and treatment for bipolar disorder.
 "99% of Us Is Failure" was written for the mother of Good's best friend, Rod Bruno. Bruno's mother had recently been diagnosed with cancer.
 "Black Helicopter" is one of Good's more political songs, dealing with (among other things) COINTELPRO, the atrocities he believes were committed by the Bush administration, and the existence of black helicopters. It was made available for download on Good's site as a Christmas gift to fans in 2006.
 "The Boy Come Home" is "based on stories of paranoia and disparity felt by a handful of Iraq veterans that Good had been corresponding with". Though Good admits that "the story conveyed in the song is fictional, ... it is steeped in a psychology that, having corresponded with those veterans, is not". Good would revisit some of these themes on "A Silent Army in the Trees" from his 2009 album, Vancouver.
 "Girl Wedged Under the Front of a Firebird" contains looped samples of a story recounted by one of Vancouver's homeless residents, about a girl who was run over by a Pontiac Firebird for drug-related reasons. Good has been a strong advocate for Vancouver's homeless population, donating to various charities and raising awareness on his personal blog.
 Both "The Devil's in Your Details" and "I'm a Window" were also released as singles.
 "True Love Will Find You in the End" is a cover of a song by Daniel Johnston. Good became enamoured with Johnston's work after watching the film The Devil and Daniel Johnston. Though they do not suffer from the same condition, both Good and Johnston have struggled with mental illness throughout their careers.

Personnel
 Matthew Good – vocals, guitar, bass guitar, keyboards, production
 Rod Bruno – lead guitar, bass guitar, vocals
 Pat Steward – drums, percussion
 Nadia Johnson – backing vocals on "Born Losers"
 Zach Blackstone – engineer, mixer
 Eric Mosher – assistant engineer
 Joao Carvalho – mastering
 Ryan Dahle – co-write and lead guitar on "The Devil's in Your Details"

References

2007 albums
Albums recorded at The Warehouse Studio
Matthew Good albums
Universal Music Canada albums